This is a list of professional wrestling promotions in Europe, sorted by country, and lists both active and defunct professional wrestling promotions.

All of Europe

Europe

Austria

Croatia

Denmark

France

Germany

Greece

Hungary

Malta

Poland

United Kingdom

See also

List of professional wrestling attendance records in Europe
List of women's wrestling promotions
List of professional wrestling promotions in South America

References

External links
Promotions
List of All Promotions at Cagematch.net
List of All Promotions at wrestlingdata.com
Promotions on onlineworldofwrestling.com

Europe
Promotions in Europe
Professional wrestling promotions